The Cadel Evans Great Ocean Road Race also known as Great Ocean Road Race or Cadel Road Race is an annual professional one-day road bicycle racing for both men and women starting and finishing in Geelong, Victoria, Australia, and routed along the picturesque Great Ocean Road. The first race was held in 2015, as the farewell race for Cadel Evans—Australia's only Tour de France winner or Road World Champion. The 2017 edition was added to the UCI World Tour for the first time.

In November 2020, it was announced that the 2021 race would not be held due to the ongoing COVID-19 global pandemic. This was due in part to a number of UCI WorldTour teams making the decision to stay in Europe due to uncertainty around international travel conditions and logistics of quarantine requirements. The event returns in 2023 to be held on 28-29 January.

Course
In 2023, the mass participation People's Ride includes three distance options—35km, 50km, or 125km.

The race starts on the Geelong waterfront in Victoria, and travels westward to the rolling hills of Moriac, turning south toward the famous surf beach of Bells Beach, following the surf coast to Torquay and through Cadel’s hometown of Barwon Heads and Ocean Grove, before heading north back to a Geelong circuit before finishing back around on the waterfront. The course is suited to puncheurs.

Men's race

Women's race

Melbourne pre-race criterium
In 2017 the pre-race criterium was known as the Race Melbourne - Albert Park, becoming the Towards Zero Race Melbourne in 2018. In 2019 the race was held in a team-based format with points awarded for sprints. Deceuninck-QuickStep won the men's event and Trek Segafredo won the women's event. In 2020 the race was not held and was replaced by Race Torquay.

Men's race

Women's race

References

Sources 
 

 
Geelong
UCI World Tour races
UCI Oceania Tour races
Cycle races in Australia
Recurring sporting events established in 2015
2015 establishments in Australia
Men's road bicycle races
Women's road bicycle races
Annual sporting events in Australia
Great Ocean Road